Eliel is a Hebrew name. It can be translated to English as "My God is God".

The name is formed from two different Hebrew terms for God. Eli, meaning "my God" and El "God". Therefore, the commonly understood meaning of the name is "my God God" or "my God is God".

People named Eliel
Ernest L. Eliel, an organic chemist
Eliel Lazo, Cuban musician
Eliel Löfgren, Swedish politician
Eliel Mickelsson, Finnish captain and politician
Eliel (producer), Puerto Rican producer
Eliel Peretz, Israeli footballer
Eliel Saarinen, Finnish architect
Eliel Soisalon-Soininen, Finnish politician
Eliel Swinton, actor and American football player
Eliel (footballer) (born 2001), Brazilian footballer

See also

Names of God in Judaism

Hebrew-language names
Finnish masculine given names